Rafał Sroka (born 29 November 1970) is a Polish former ice hockey player. He played for Podhale Nowy Targ and Hc Banská Bystrica during his career. Sroka also played for the Polish national team at the 1992 Winter Olympics.

References

External links
 

1970 births
Living people
HC '05 Banská Bystrica players
Ice hockey players at the 1992 Winter Olympics
Olympic ice hockey players of Poland
People from Nowy Targ
Podhale Nowy Targ players
Polish ice hockey defencemen
Sportspeople from Lesser Poland Voivodeship
Polish expatriate ice hockey people
Polish expatriate sportspeople in Slovakia
Expatriate ice hockey players in Slovakia